Kang Young-jun (born ) is a South Korean male volleyball player. He currently plays for the Uijeongbu KB Insurance Stars.

Career

Clubs
Kang was selected first overall by the Woori Capital Dream Six in the 2009 V-League Draft.

Kang was drafted to expansion team  OK Savings Bank Rush & Cash in the 2013 V-League Expansion Draft. Kang helped the team to win two consecutive championships  serving as the backup opposite spiker to Robertlandy Simon.

After the 2016–17 season, Kang was traded to the KB Insurance Stars for Kim Yo-han.

National team
While attending Inchang High School in Guri, Kang was selected for the South Korean junior national team, which won the 2004 Asian Junior Volleyball Championship in Doha. At the 2005 Asian Youth Volleyball Championship in Tehran, Kang played as the starting opposite spiker and helped Team Korea to the gold medal match, where they lost to Iran. He was named the tournament's "Best Spiker".

As a senior at Kyonggi University in 2009, Kang got called up to the South Korean collegiate national team for the 2009 Summer Universiade in Belgrade, where the team finished in 10th place.

Individual awards

National Team
 2005 Asian Youth Championship - Best Spiker

External links
 Profile at FIVB.org

1987 births
Living people
South Korean men's volleyball players
People from Anyang, Gyeonggi
21st-century South Korean people